John Deasy (born 8 October 1967) is a former Irish Fine Gael politician who served as a Teachta Dála (TD) for the Waterford constituency from 2002 to 2020.

Early and personal life
Deasy was brought up in Stradbally and Dungarvan, County Waterford. He was educated at Coláiste na Rinne, An Rinn, County Waterford, and at St. Augustine's College in Dungarvan. Deasy studied at Mercyhurst College, Erie, Pennsylvania, on a golfing scholarship where he received a Bachelor of Arts in History and Communications.

In 1990, Deasy was employed as a legislative assistant in the United States Senate, handling trade and foreign affairs, for Republican Senator John Heinz. He remained in the position until Heinz's death in 1991. The following year he became manager of public affairs for a multinational waste company. Deasy was also legislative assistant in the United States House of Representatives, handling trade, foreign affairs, energy, environment, banking, economic development, immigration and human rights, for Congressman Ronald Machtley.

He returned to Ireland in 1997, and studied at University College Cork, qualifying with a degree in law. In May 2005, Deasy married the RTÉ presenter, Maura Derrane. The couple have a son, Cal, born in 2014.

Political career
In 1999, he embarked on a political career and was elected to Waterford County Council and Dungarvan Town Council. At the 2002 general election he was elected to Dáil Éireann for the first time, succeeding his father, former Minister for Agriculture Austin Deasy, who was retiring. He was appointed Spokesperson for Justice, Equality and Law Reform, by the new leader, Enda Kenny. He was sacked from the Fine Gael front bench in 2004, for smoking tobacco in the members bar at Leinster House, the seat of the Irish Parliament, just days after a nationwide ban on smoking in the workplace had come into effect. In October 2004, he failed to return to the front bench in the reshuffle, but was appointed Chairman of the Dáil European Union Affairs Committee.

In January 2007, he announced his intention to challenge Enda Kenny's leadership of Fine Gael, should the party fail to enter government after the 2007 election. Fine Gael did not enter government, nor did Deasy carry out his challenge. He served as party Deputy Spokesperson on Foreign Affairs, with special responsibility for Overseas Development Aid from 2007 to 2010. Having topped the poll in Waterford at the 2011 election, he was vice-chair of the Dáil Committee of Public Accounts.

Deasy was re-elected at the 2016 election. In July 2017, he was appointed government envoy to the United States Congress advocating for Irish undocumented immigrants. In November 2017, he announced that he would not be standing at the next general election due to health concerns. In June 2019, the Fine Gael organisation in Waterford constituency passed a motion of no confidence in Deasy, supporting his longtime rival Paudie Coffey.

See also
Families in the Oireachtas

References

External links

John Deasy's page on the Fine Gael website

 

1967 births
Living people
Alumni of University College Cork
Fine Gael TDs
Local councillors in County Waterford
Members of the 29th Dáil
Members of the 30th Dáil
Members of the 31st Dáil
Members of the 32nd Dáil
Mercyhurst University alumni
People from Dungarvan
Politicians from County Waterford
People educated at St Augustine's College, Dungarvan